Ali Rizvi or Ali Razvi may refer to:

 Ali A. Rizvi (born 1975), Pakistani-born Canadian physician, writer and ex-Muslim atheist activist
 Ali Rizvi Badshah, Canadian comedian
 Ali Hussain Rizvi (born 1974), former Pakistani cricketer
 Naushad Ali (cricketer) (born 1943), Naushad Ali Rizvi, former Pakistani cricketer
 Syed Ali Nawaz Shah Rizvi (born 1942), Pakistani politician
 Syed Ali Qutab Shah Rizvi, member of the Pakistani Sindh Provincial Assembly

See also
 Rizvi